is a Japanese FM radio station under the name . It was founded in 2000.

On March 18, 2020, the board of directors of the station voted to close the station and announcing officially the station closing. On June 30, 2020 at 11:59 p.m. (JST), the station officially closed after almost 20 years on the air as well as removing itself from Radiko and on July 14, the bankruptcy proceedings started. The total debt is about 220 million yen (USD$2,078,952).

Programs
 °C-ute Maimi Yajima's I My Me Maimi~
 Chiharu Matsuyama on the Radio (simulcast on FM Nack5, Saitama)

See also
 FM broadcasting in Japan

External links
 

Radio stations in Japan
Radio stations established in 2000
Radio stations disestablished in 2020
Mass media in Niigata (city)
Companies based in Niigata Prefecture
Defunct radio stations in Japan